Chan-Jin Chung (정찬진) or popularly known as "CJ" Chung is a full professor of Computer Science at Lawrence Technological University(LTU) in Michigan, USA. He founded an international autonomous robotics competition called Robofest in the 1999–2000 academic year as well as numerous educational programs for youth by integrating STEM (Science, technology, engineering, and mathematics), arts, autonomous robotics, and computer science. He also served as the founding USA National Organizer of World Robot Olympiad (WRO) in 2014 and 2015. He also started the WISER (World conference on Integrated STEaM Education through Robotics) conference in 2014.
His research areas include evolutionary computation, cultural algorithms,
intelligent systems & autonomous mobile robotics,
software engineering,
 
machine learning & deep learning, 
 
computer science education, 
and educational robotics.

Early life, education, and research & development projects

Chung was born in Seoul, Korea and attended Hongik University in Seoul, where he earned a B.S. Computer Science degree in 1981.
His first professional job was teaching middle school math as a part-time instructor at YMCA Academy in Seoul in 1979. He worked for Korea Electric Power Corporation to develop an online customer information system with COBOL and IMS Databases using IBM 3031 mainframe computer in 1981–1982.
While he was working for Electronics and Telecommunications Research Institute (ETRI) as a research scientist from 1982 to 1992, he was involved in developing TDX switching systems
that became later the base system for the first commercialized CDMA system in the world. Chung also worked as a visiting researcher to develop telecommunication software modules for L.M. Ericsson's AXE-10 in Stockholm, Sweden in 1983–1984. He received his Ph.D. in computer science from Wayne State University in 1997. His doctoral research was the development of a self-adaptive artificial intelligence system motivated by cultural evolution processes, which was then applied to solve nonlinear function optimization problems including training artificial neural networks. Wei-Wen Chang, his Master's student and Chung won the 1st place award in 3D design optimization competition sponsored by HONDA R&D Europe GmbH as a part of the IEEE World Congress in Computational Intelligence Conference in 2002.
He won a REU grant from National Science Foundation (NSF) in 2022.

Achievements in STEaM, robotics, and computer science education fields
A world-wide autonomous robot competition called Robofest 

was the brainchild of Prof. Chung.
As of August 2019, over 28,000 students from 15 US States and 22 countries have participated in the competition since 1999. 
 He launched numerous integrated educational programs in computer science and STEAM fields such as RoboParade a parade of autonomous vehicles in 2006, RoboFashion and Dance Show in 2007, Vision Centric robot Challenge (Vcc) in 2007, Robot Music Camp in 2013, Global Robotics Art Festival (GRAF) in 2013, WRO-USA in 2014, CS+PA^2: Learning Computer Science with Physical Activities and Animation  

in 2018, and Robofest eAcademy with Elmer Santos in 2019.

He has been a faculty advisor of LTU's IGVC (Intelligent Ground Vehicle Competition) teams since 2003.
His H2Bot team won 1st place design award in 2007. His team was also selected to represent the US to compete at RoboCup Four-legged robot soccer division in 2007. 
BigFoot II team won the Grand Award LESCOE Cup in 2016. As of June 2020, he leads ACTor (Autonomous Campus TranspORt) project using a drive-by-wire electric vehicle. The ACTor vehicle team won the Self-Drive Challenge competition at the IGVC in 2017, 2018, and 2019.

In 2011, IEEE USA honored Dr. Chung with its citation of honor award for his leadership in STEM education.

Honours, awards and distinctions
 The Robert Neff Memorial Award, for outstanding contributions to the IEEE Southeast Michigan Section, by the Engineering Society of Detroit Affiliate Council, March 15, 2023
 Engineering Society of Detroit (ESD) GOLD Awards – Outstanding IEEE Member Award, March 11, 2015, at ESD Gold Award Banquet
 Citation of Honor Award, IEEE-USA, “for the leadership in founding the Robofest competition to inspire interest in engineering among pre-college students”, March 2011
 MGA Achievement Award, IEEE Member Geographic Activities (MGA) Board, “for inspiring thousands of young students into the science and engineering career path through his Robofest and hands-on robotics workshops”, December, 2010
 The Mary E. and Richard E. Marburger Distinguished Achievement Award – 2007 Champion for Institutional Excellence and Preeminence, Lawrence Technological University
 Excellent Research Award, Electronics and Telecommunications Research Institute (ETRI), December 31, 1986, Certificate No. 151

References and notes

External links
 CJ Chung's Personal Homepage

 Robofest Homepage
 Robofest FaceBook page
 RoboParade
 CS+PA^2
 World Robot Olympiad USA 2014 and 2015

1959 births
Living people
People from Seoul
Computer scientists
Computer science educators
Hongik University alumni
Wayne State University alumni